Abu Mansur Muhammad ibn 'Abd al-Razzaq ibn 'Abdallah ibn Farrukh, also simply known as Abu Mansur Muhammad and Ibn 'Abd al-Razzaq, was an Iranian aristocrat who served the Samanids during the most of career, and briefly served as governor of Azerbaijan under the Buyids.

Biography

Early service under the Samanids and rebellion 
Abu Mansur was the son of a certain 'Abd al-Razzaq, and had a brother named Rafi. He was also related to the Samanid officer Amirak Tusi, and belonged to a dehqan family from Tus, which claimed descent from a spahbed ("army chief"), who lived during the lifetime of the Sasanian king Khosrau II. The family further claimed descent from the Pishdadian dynasty. When the Samanid ruler Nasr II (r. 914-943) appointed the Muhtajid prince Abu 'Ali Chaghani as the governor of Khurasan, Abu Mansur ruled Tus on behalf of Abu 'Ali until 945, and then, along with his brother Rafi, joined Abu 'Ali's rebellion against Nasr's successor, Nuh I (r. 943-954). While Abu 'Ali was making expeditions against the Samanids, Abu Mansur was appointed as his sipahsalar (commander) in Khurasan.

Bukhara was shortly captured by the forces of Abu 'Ali, and Nuh's uncle Ibrahim ibn Ahmad was crowned as the new ruler of the Samanid dynasty. However, in 947, Nuh I managed to recapture Bukhara and have Ibrahim blinded. He was, however, unable to win a decisive battle over Abu 'Ali, who had obtained the support of other Samanid vassals, such as the rulers of Khuttal, and made peace with him instead.

Service under the Buyids 

Meanwhile, Abu Mansur fled to the Buyid city of Ray, where he took refuge, and was honored by the Buyid ruler Rukn al-Dawla, who, along with his brothers Imad al-Dawla and Mu'izz al-Dawla, greatly awarded him with riches. He was shortly sent to Damghan in order to protect Ray from an Samanid invasion. In 948/949, during negotiations between Mu'izz al-Dawla's and the Sallarid ruler Marzuban's ambassadors, Marzuban was greatly insulted, and became enraged; he tried to avenge himself by marching towards Ray. Rukn al-Dawla, however, managed to trick and slow Marzuban down by diplomatic means, while he was preparing an army to attack Marzuban. Rukn al-Dawla shortly sent an army under Abu Mansur to Qazvin, where he managed to defeat and capture Marzuban, who was imprisoned by Rukn al-Dawla.

In 949, Abu Mansur was sent to an expedition to conquer Azerbaijan from the Sallarids. Marzuban's brother and the Sallarid ruler of Dailam, Wahsudan, shortly sent an army under the Kurdish general Daisam, but the latter was forced to retreat to Arran. Furthermore, the vizier of Daisam, Ibn Mahmud, betrayed him and joined Abu Mansur, who managed to successfully conquer Azerbaijan. Ibn Mahmud was shortly appointed by Abu Mansur as his minister. However, an unnamed secretary of Abu Mansur, who had greatly helped him during his conquest of Azerbaijan, felt insulted that he had chosen Ibn Mahmud as his minister instead of him, and shortly raised an army, and joined Daisam. Meanwhile, Abu Mansur, who was not used to the environment of Azerbaijan, left the region with Ibn Mahmud, and returned to Ray.

Later service under the Samanids and death 

In 950/951, Abu Mansur returned to his native Khurasan, where he was pardoned by Nuh II, and was reappointed as the governor of Tus. In 953, Abu Mansur played a prominent role in the peace treaty between Nuh II and Rukn al-Dawla. He later wanted to create a Shahnameh ("Book of Kings"), and ordered his new minister Abu Mansur Mamari to invite several scholars in order to create the book; they created a New Persian version of the Khwaday-Namag in 957, and expanded it with other sources. The book became known as Shahnama-yi Abu Mansuri ("The book of kings of Abu Mansuri"), and was later the main source of Shahnameh of the famous Iranian poet and Abu Mansur's friend, Ferdowsi.

However, only the introduction of the book remains today. Nuh II died in 954, and was succeeded by his son Abd al-Malik I. Meanwhile, Turkic officers began increasing their power and influence, thus resulting in instability in the Samanid state. Abu Mansur was later appointed as the sipahsalar of Khurasan. 6 months later, however, he was replaced by the Turkic general Alptigin, and shortly returned to Tus.  Abd al-Malik later died in an accident in 961, which resulted in a succession crisis; The faction of Alptigin and Muhammad Bal'ami wanted Abd al-Malik's young son Nasr as the new Samanid ruler, while a faction of the Turkic general Fa'iq and several prominent Iranian statesmen, wanted the latter's brother Mansur I as the new Samanid ruler.

Fa'iq eventually managed to emerge victorious, and Alptigin rebelled, while Mansur I was crowned as the ruler of the Samanids. Abu Mansur was shortly appointed as the sipahsalar of Khorasan by Mansur, and was ordered to defeat rebellious Alptigin, which he was unable to; and Alptigin managed to escape to Balkh. Abu Mansur, fearing the wrath of his master, shortly changed his allegiance to Rukn al-Dawla, which resulted in the death of Abu Mansur during a battle with the newly appointed sipahsalar of Khurasan, Abu'l-Hasan Muhammad Simjuri. Abu Mansur was survived by his two sons, Abdallah Tusi, and Mansur Tusi.

References

Sources 
 
 
 
 
 
 

10th-century Iranian politicians
961 deaths
Samanid generals
Buyid generals
Rebellions against the Samanid Empire
People from Tus, Iran
Dehqans
Buyid governors
Medieval Iranian Azerbaijan
Year of birth unknown
Samanid governors of Khorasan